Walter Davis  was a rugby union player who represented Australia.

Davis, a prop and lock, claimed a three international rugby caps for Australia. His debut game was against Great Britain at Sydney on 24 June 1899, the inaugural rugby Test match played by an Australian national representative side.

Published references
 Collection (1995) Gordon Bray presents The Spirit of Rugby, Harper Collins Publishers Sydney
 Howell, Max (2005) Born to Lead - Wallaby Test Captains, Celebrity Books, Auckland NZ

Footnotes

Australian rugby union players
Australia international rugby union players
Year of birth missing
Year of death missing
Rugby union locks
Rugby union props